Kevin Krawietz (born 24 January 1992) is a German professional tennis player who specialises in doubles.

He is a two-time Grand Slam champion, having won the French Open doubles title in both 2019 and 2020 alongside compatriot Andreas Mies. The pair were also semifinalists at the 2019 US Open. Krawietz reached the mixed doubles semifinals at the 2021 Wimbledon Championships and 2022 French Open, partnering Květa Peschke and Nicole Melichar-Martinez respectively, and has qualified for the ATP Finals on three occasions.

He achieved his career-high doubles ranking of world No. 7 in November 2019, and has won eight doubles titles on the ATP Tour, including two at ATP Tour 500 level. In singles, Krawietz reached his highest ranking of world No. 211 in December 2018. He has represented Germany in the Davis Cup since 2019, and also competed at the 2020 Olympic Games in both men's and mixed doubles.

Junior career 
Krawietz won one junior Grand Slam title, the 2009 Wimbledon Championships – Boys' doubles tournament.

Professional career

2009
Krawietz made his ATP debut at the German Open as a wildcard. He lost to Jan Hernych in the first round in three sets.

2010
Krawietz received a wildcard for the BMW Open in Munich, where he lost to Tomáš Berdych in the first round in straight sets.

2011–2017 
Krawietz played mainly on the ITF Circuit and the ATP Challenger Tour. In 2015, he won his first Challenger doubles title at the Morocco Tennis Tour in Meknes, partnering with Maximilian Marterer.

2018: New partnership with Mies
Krawietz reached the third round at the Wimbledon Championships in doubles with partner Andreas Mies as a qualifier, where they lost to the later champions Mike Bryan and Jack Sock despite having two match points.

2019: Historic French Open doubles title
Krawietz won his first doubles title on the ATP Tour at the New York Open, again with Mies.

He and Mies won sensationally the French Open doubles title as unseeded players, defeating the French duo Jérémy Chardy and Fabrice Martin in the final. This victory made them the first all-German team in the Open Era to win a Grand Slam title, and the first since Gottfried von Cramm and Henner Henkel in 1937.

He won his first main draw singles match on the ATP Tour as a qualifier at the Antalya Open, defeating wild card Cem İlkel in the first round.

At the US Open, he and Mies reached the semifinals. They won their third title at the European Open in Antwerp.

2020: Second French Open doubles title 
Krawietz and Mies successfully defended their French Open title, defeating Mate Pavić and Bruno Soares in straight sets in the final. After winning the title twice, they have not yet lost a match at the French Open as a pair.

2021: First ATP 500 doubles title
Krawietz won his fifth doubles title at the Bavarian Championships in Munich, partnering Wesley Koolhof.

For the French Open, he teamed up with Horia Tecău. As a twice defending champion he extended his unbeaten run to 15 wins before finally suffering his first French Open defeat in a quarterfinal loss.

He and Tecău won the Halle Open, which was his first title at an ATP 500 tournament, and his first on grass.

2022: Reunion with Mies, one more ATP 500 title and second home title

Performance timelines

Doubles
Current through the 2023 Indian Wells Masters.

Mixed doubles

Grand Slam finals

Doubles: 2 (2 titles)

ATP career finals

Doubles: 12 (8 titles, 4 runner-ups)

ATP Challenger and ITF Futures finals

Singles: 13 (4–9)

Doubles: 72 (44–28)

Junior Grand Slam finals

Doubles: 2 (1 title, 1 runner-up)

National participation

Davis Cup (11–1)

ATP Cup  (3–5)

References

External links 

 Official website 
 
 
 

1992 births
Living people
German male tennis players
People from Coburg
Sportspeople from Upper Franconia
Tennis people from Bavaria
French Open champions
Grand Slam (tennis) champions in men's doubles
Tennis players at the 2010 Summer Youth Olympics
Wimbledon junior champions
Grand Slam (tennis) champions in boys' doubles
Olympic tennis players of Germany
Tennis players at the 2020 Summer Olympics
21st-century German people